Dominion Derby Girls is a women's flat-track roller derby league based in Virginia Beach, Virginia. The Dominion Derby Girls is a member of the Women's Flat Track Derby Association (WFTDA.

History and organization
Home bouts for DDG are held at the Haygood Skating Center in Virginia Beach, their home skating rink. The DDG participates in various charity and fundraising events around the Hampton Roads area, including the annual Polar Plunge, various Breast Cancer Awareness fundraisers, and St. Baldricks Foundation.

Dominion was announced as a new member of the WFTDA in May 2007.

WFTDA competition
In 2008, Dominion qualified for the WFTDA Eastern Regional Tournament for the first time as the lowest seed, however they withdrew from the tournament in advance due to skater availability and costs. The following year, Dominion again qualified for the Eastern Regional Tournament, this time as the tenth seed, but lost all three of their games and ultimately finished in tenth place after a 156-57 loss to CT RollerGirls.

Rankings

Teams

Active teams
The Dominion Derby Girls league is composed of two teams which play interleague bouts: the All Stars and the Seven City Sirens (B-team). The All Stars compete with other WFTDA member teams in sanctioned bouts for rankings. The Sirens compete against other leagues' B-teams or WFTDA apprentice leagues.

Former teams
In previous years DDG has had home teams who competed against each other and were composed of skaters from both the All Stars and Seven City Sirens. Those teams included the St. Brawli Girls, Dirty Diesel Darlins, and Femmes Fatales. As of the 2012 season, the home teams had been dissolved.

References

External links
Official Website
 "Super Heroes on Skates"

Roller derby leagues in Virginia
Women's sports in the United States
Sports in Virginia Beach, Virginia
Roller derby leagues established in 2006
2006 establishments in Virginia